William Halsey Kinne (April 22, 1846 – March 16, 1943) was an American merchant and politician from New York.

Life 
Kinne was born on April 22, 1846, in Romulus, New York. His parents, Mr. and Mrs. Silas Kinne, were pioneer settlers of south Seneca County.

Kinne attended Ovid Academy. He then moved to Ovid and worked as a coal and lumber dealer. He was a member of the Kinne Bros. firm, dealers of lumber, coal, builders' supplies, and farm machinery.

In 1891, Kinne was elected to the New York State Assembly as a Democrat, representing Seneca County. He served in the Assembly in 1892 and 1896. In 1913, he was appointed postmaster for the village of Ovid.

Kinne was married to Elnora Blaine. Their children were Mrs. John G. Gordon, Mrs. S. E. Mekell, Charles, and James B. For the last several years of his life, he lived with his son Charles in Waterloo.

Kinne died on March 16, 1943, at his son Charles' home in Waterloo. He was buried in the Ovid Union Cemetery.

References

External links 
 The Political Graveyard

19th-century American politicians
Democratic Party members of the New York State Assembly
New York (state) postmasters
1846 births
1943 deaths
People from Romulus, New York
People from Ovid, New York
People from Waterloo, New York
Burials in New York (state)